Sir Noel Robert Malcolm,  (born 26 December 1956) is an English political journalist, historian and academic. A King's Scholar at Eton College, Malcolm read history at Peterhouse, Cambridge, and received his doctorate in history from Trinity College, Cambridge. He was a Fellow and College Lecturer of Gonville and Caius College, Cambridge, before becoming a political and foreign affairs journalist for The Spectator and the Daily Telegraph.

He stepped away from journalism in 1995 to become a writer and academic, being appointed as a Visiting Fellow of St Antony's College, Oxford, for two years. He became a Fellow of the Royal Society of Literature (FRSL) in 1997 and a Fellow of the British Academy (FBA) in 2001. Since 2002 he has been a senior research fellow of All Souls College, Oxford. He was knighted in the 2014 New Year Honours for services to scholarship, journalism, and European history.

Early life and education
Malcolm was born on 26 December 1956. He was educated at Eton College, an all-boys public school near Windsor, Berkshire, as a King's Scholar. He studied history at Peterhouse, Cambridge, between 1974 and 1978. He received his PhD in history while he was at Trinity College, Cambridge.

Career
Malcolm was a Fellow and college lecturer at Gonville and Caius College, Cambridge, from 1981 to 1988. He was a political columnist (1987–1991), then the foreign editor (1991–1992) of The Spectator, and a political columnist for the Daily Telegraph (1992–1995). He was jointly awarded the T. E. Utley Prize for Political Journalism in 1991.

In 1995 he gave up journalism to become a full-time writer. He was a Visiting Fellow of St Antony's College, Oxford, in 1995–1996, and has been a senior research fellow of All Souls College, Oxford, since 2002. He serves on the advisory board of the conservative magazine Standpoint.

Malcolm used to be the chairman of the Bosnian Institute, London, and president of the Anglo-Albanian Association.

Honours
Malcolm became a Fellow of the Royal Society of Literature (FRSL) in 1997 and a Fellow of the British Academy (FBA) in 2001. He is a Liveryman of the Worshipful Company of Fishmongers. 

He is a Member of the Academy of Sciences and Arts of Kosovo, and an honorary fellow of both Peterhouse, Cambridge (since 2010), and Trinity College, Cambridge (since 2011). 

In 2013, he was awarded the British Academy Medal for his book Thomas Hobbes: Leviathan. 

Malcolm was knighted in the 2014 New Year Honours for services to scholarship, journalism, and European history. In 2016, he was awarded the Presidential Gold Medal of the League of Prizren by the president of Kosovo, Hashim Thaçi.

Works

Books
Malcolm is the author of

 De Dominis, 1560–1624: Venetian, Anglican, Ecumenist, and Relapsed Heretic (1984)
 George Enescu: His Life and Music ( Toccata Press, 1990), which has been translated into several languages
 Bosnia: A Short History (New York University Press, 1994), which has been translated into several languages
 Origins of English Nonsense (HarperCollins, 1997)
 Kosovo: A Short History (New York University Press, 1998)
 Books on Bosnia: A Critical Bibliography of Works relating to Bosnia-Herzegovina Published Since 1990 in West European Languages (with Quintin Hoare) (Bosnian Institute, 1999)
 Aspects of Hobbes (Oxford University Press, 2002)
 John Pell (1611–1685) and His Correspondence with Sir Charles Cavendish: The Mental World of an Early Modern Mathematician (with Jacqueline Stedall) (Oxford University Press, 2005)
 Agents of Empire: Knights, Corsairs, Jesuits and Spies in the Late Sixteenth-Century Mediterranean World (2015)
 Useful Enemies: Islam and The Ottoman Empire in Western Political Thought, 1450-1750 (2019)
 Rebels, Believers, Survivors: Studies in the History of the Albanians (Oxford University Press, 2020)

Malcolm edited Reason of State, Propaganda, and the Thirty Years War: An Unknown Translation by Thomas Hobbes (Clarendon Press, 2007), The Correspondence of Thomas Hobbes (1994) and Thomas Hobbes’s Leviathan (three volumes, Oxford University Press, 2012), for which he was awarded a British Academy Medal. He has also contributed more than 40 journal articles or chapters in books since 2002.

Journalism
Malcolm has written many articles for newspapers, magazines and journals. Other than his work for The Spectator, the Daily Telegraph and Standpoint he has had articles published in The Guardian, The Sunday Telegraph, the New York Times, the Washington Times, Time and the Daily Mail, among other publications. He has also contributed book reviews mainly to The Sunday Telegraph. He has contributed to a number of journals including Foreign Affairs and the New York Review of Books.

Critical reviews of Kosovo: A Short History
Malcolm's book Kosovo: A Short History (1998) was the subject of an extended debate in Foreign Affairs. The debate began with a review of the book by Aleksa Djilas, a former Fellow of the Russian Research Center at Harvard University, who wrote that the book was "marred by his sympathies for its ethnic Albanian separatists, anti-Serbian bias, and illusions about the Balkans". Malcolm responded that Djilas had not produced any evidence to counter the evidence in the book, and had instead resorted to belittling both Malcolm and his work, including the use of personal slurs and patronising language. The debate continued with Serbian-born Professor Stevan K. Pavlowitch of the University of Southampton asserting that Malcolm's book lacked precision, Melanie McDonagh of the Bosnian Institute claiming that Djilas's review took a "nationalistic approach", and Norman Cigar of Marine Corps University stating that Djilas was trying to create myths to legitimise Serbian actions in Kosovo.

Other reviews of Kosovo: A Short History were varied. For example, in English Historical Review, Zbyněk Zeman observed that Malcolm "tries not to take sides", but in American Historical Review, Nicholas J. Miller stated that the book was "conceptually flawed" by Malcolm's insistence on treating Kosovo as "a place on its own; [rather than as] a scrap of irredenta that Serbs and Albanians fight over". 

Later the same year Thomas Emmert of the history faculty of Gustavus Adolphus College, Minnesota, reviewed the book in the Journal of Southern Europe and the Balkans Online and, while praising aspects of the book, also asserted that it was "shaped by the author's overriding determination to challenge Serbian myths". He claimed that Malcolm was "partisan" and complained that the book made a "transparent attempt to prove that the main Serbian myths are false". Malcolm responded in the same journal in early 2000, asserting that the book challenged both Albanian and Serbian myths about Kosovo, but that there were more Serbian myths about Kosovo than Albanian ones and this explained the greater coverage of Serbian myths in the book. He also observed that Emmert's perspective and work were largely within the framework of Serbian historiography, and that that was the reason for Emmert's assertion that Malcolm was "partisan". Emmert also criticized Malcolm's opposition to the Serbian claim to Kosovo as the “cradle of civilization”, stating that Kosovo did become the center of medieval Serbia and that such feelings among modern Serbs should not be disputed. He also noted the absence of Serbian archives. Likewise, Tim Judah and Misha Glenny criticized Malcolm for not using Serbian sources in the book. He responded that there were no proper Serbian archives for that period of history, but also noted that he had studied a large number of works by Serbian and Montenegrin authors.

In 2006 a study by Frederick Anscombe looked at issues surrounding scholarship on Kosovo such as Noel Malcolm's book. Anscombe noted that Malcolm offered "a detailed critique of the competing versions of Kosovo's history" and that his work marked a "remarkable reversal" of previous acceptance by western historians of the "Serbian account" regarding the migration of the Serbs (1690) from Kosovo. 

Malcolm has been criticized for being "anti-Serbian" and selective with sources, while other critics have concluded that "his arguments are unconvincing". The majority of the documents that Malcolm used were written by adversaries of the Ottoman state or by officials with limited experience of the region. Anscombe notes that Malcolm, like Serbian and Yugoslav historians who have ignored his conclusions, have not considered indigenous evidence such as that from the Ottoman archive when composing national history.

In a 2007 work the Serbian historian Dušan T. Bataković claimed that Malcolm's book about Kosovo was "notoriously pro-Albanian". Frederick Anscombe has accused Bataković of writing several works in the 1980s and 1990s which advanced a Serbian nationalist perspective regarding Kosovo.

See also
Kosovo Myth
Great Migrations of the Serbs
Serbian historiography

Footnotes

References

Books

Journals

Newspapers and magazines

Websites

1956 births
Living people
People from Surrey
People educated at Eton College
Alumni of Peterhouse, Cambridge
English male journalists
English historians
Historians of the Balkans
Fellows of Gonville and Caius College, Cambridge
Fellows of All Souls College, Oxford
Fellows of the British Academy
Fellows of the Royal Society of Literature
Hobbes scholars
Knights Bachelor
English male non-fiction writers
Recipients of the British Academy Medal
Members of the Academy of Sciences and Arts of Kosovo